Michael Joseph Gandy (born January 3, 1979 in Rockford, Illinois) is a former American football offensive tackle. He was drafted by the Chicago Bears in the third round of the 2001 NFL Draft and later played for the Buffalo Bills and Arizona Cardinals. He played college football at the University of Notre Dame.

Professional career

Chicago Bears
He was drafted by the Chicago Bears in the third round of the 2001 NFL Draft and played with the team for four seasons.

Buffalo Bills
After the 2004 NFL season, Gandy signed with the Buffalo Bills, remaining with the team through the 2006 season.

Arizona Cardinals
On April 2, 2007, he signed with the Arizona Cardinals. After aggravating a pelvic/groin injury against the Titans in week 11 of the 2009 season that turned out to be season-ending, he was placed on injured reserve and released by the team after the season.

References

External links
Arizona Cardinals bio
Article on Gandy's 2009 injury
Article on Gandy being placed on IR in 2009

1979 births
Living people
Garland High School alumni
Sportspeople from Rockford, Illinois
People from Dallas
Players of American football from Illinois
Players of American football from Texas
American football offensive tackles
American football offensive guards
Notre Dame Fighting Irish football players
Chicago Bears players
Buffalo Bills players
Arizona Cardinals players